Harrow: A Very British School is an 8-part documentary series broadcast in the United Kingdom on Sky1. The series was a fly-on-the-wall look behind the doors of Harrow School and followed a group of students from West Acre House.

It was one of several similar series produced for Sky in 2013, including Greggs: More Than Meets the Pie, All Aboard East Coast Trains and Inside RAF Brize Norton.

It follows the students of the house amongst their daily routines, as well as some of the more unusual Harrow traditions. The house master of West Acre is Martin Smith and he has a dog called Tara. His vice head of West Acre is Richard Harvey.

References

2013 in British television
Harrow School